The bushfire season in the summer of 2014–15, was expected to have the potential for many fires in eastern Australia after lower than expected rainfall was received in many areas. Authorities released warnings in the early spring that the season could be particularly bad.

Warmer and drier weather conditions were experienced during winter and extended into 2015, due to a developing El Niño event. Sydney was on track to record its hottest autumn on record and only had one fifth of the average rainfall in May.

Queensland sweltered through a heatwave, with record October temperatures being set in many towns through the state.

Throughout 2014 and the first 6 months of 2015, 18 fires were declared "national disasters" affecting a total of 68 local government areas across New South Wales, South Australia, Victoria and the Northern Territory.

Fires of note

Fires by state or territory

New South Wales

August

During an 8-day period starting on 1 August 114 bush and grass fires burned through  of the Clarence Valley and Kempsey local government areas. Five houses were destroyed and a further eight were extensively damaged during the blazes. Eight non-residential buildings and four vehicles were also destroyed in the blazes. A number of these fires were caused by escaped private hazard reduction burns.

November

Fires started near Katoomba in the Blue Mountains just as heatwave conditions commenced in the area on 1 November. The fire dropped over an escarpment and into inaccessible bushland. One house was destroyed and a second house damaged along Cliff Drive after 60 people were evacuated from the area.

More fires started 14 November near Warrimoo in the Blue Mountains. The local school was evacuated as the out of control blaze spread from a difficult to reach area. Some 36 firefighters were brought in to control the fire which spread toward Blaxland.

Northern Territory

August & September

Throughout both months, a series of small, suspicious bushfires burned through at least  and threatened many properties around Howard Springs and Humpty Doo. On 29 August a house was destroyed in a fire that is thought to have been deliberately lit.

Approximately  of pastoral country was burnt out by a fire that burnt for over a week. Most of Birrimba Station, a large portion of Dungowan Station, some of Murranjai and a little of Killarney Station were burnt out.

Queensland

October

After several days of above average temperatures, at least 18 fires were ignited by lightning in the Darling Downs Granite belt and Sunshine Coast hinterland regions.

November

Over  of forest was burnt out by fires near Ravenshoe, south west of Cairns in the far north of Queensland. The fire threatened about 30 homes but was repelled by fire fighters; a shed and caravan were destroyed.

South Australia

November

December

On 16 December, two fires ignited in the Barossa Valley area. A firefighter was injured while containing a grassfire that burnt through  near Springton. The second fire, near Angaston, burned through  and caused extensive damage to the vineyards of Hutton Vale winery, before being extinguished.

January

The fire also had a significant impact on local agricultural industry;  of vineyards were destroyed and 900 head of livestock died in the fire. The towns of Cudlee Creek, Gumeracha, Houghton, Kersbrook and Millbrook were threatened by the fire before it was contained on 7 January. Roughly 3,500 firefighters in 1,164 appliances, supported by 25 aircraft, fought the fire on a  perimeter; at least 134 firefighters and civilians suffered injuries, mostly minor, during the 6-day incident.

Victoria

December

On 15 December, a lightning storm ignited 350 fires across the state; at Creightons Creek, south of Euroa, 4 houses were destroyed by the 'Creightons Creek' fire and at Lake Rowan, 1 house was destroyed by the 'Lake Rowan-Warby Ranges' fire. The 'Creightons Creek' fire burned through  and caused the death of 1,100 head of livestock and the 'Lake Rowan-Warby Ranges' fire burned through  and caused the death of 1,700 head of livestock. A total of 1,400 firefighting personnel fought the 350 fires, which also included a  fire at Stewarton, north of Benalla, and a small grassfire that burned to within  of West Wodonga.

January

The fire had a significant impact on local agricultural industry; at least 90 farms were damaged—including hundreds of kilometers of fencing—and 3,000 head of livestock died. Within 5 hours from ignition, the fire had progressed , burned  with a  perimeter. The fire caused large plumes of toxic smoke when it burned through over 30,000 tyres on a private property.

Western Australia

September

A large bushfire started 16 September and was finally brought under control 12 days later after burning through  of mostly bushland. The fire threatened the town of Tom Price and western portion of Karijini National Park.

November

At Gingin, north of Perth, a house and a shed were also damaged in a bushfire.

January

On 5 January, one house and one vehicle were destroyed at Yallingup by a small  bushfire. 72 firefighters took 5 hours to bring the fire under control, and one firefighter was treated for heat exhaustion.

On 31 January, one house, several vehicles and a number of sheds were destroyed by a  bushfire that had ignited on 29 January and threatened the town of Waroona. A portion of the South Western Highway was closed and over 50 residents were evacuated. Approximately 200 firefighters were required to combat the blaze.

February

Another fire that had been ignited by lightning between 29–31 January burned through  of scrub, forest and pasture near Lower Hotham, in Boddington Shire; one house, two sheds, and the 66-year-old wooden Long Gully Bridge were destroyed in the blaze.

References

2014
2014 wildfires
2015 wildfires
Bushfire
Bushfire
2014 fires in Oceania 
2015 fires in Oceania